Vani Harikrishna is an Indian film playback singer and music director, who works in South Indian films, primarily in Kannada cinema. She has composed, written and sung several devotional songs before entering into the film playback singing. She won Karnataka State Award for her rendition of "Madhuvana Karedare" song from the film Inthi Ninna Preethiya. Vani debuted as a film composer with the 2013 film Loosegalu. Currently Jury member of Sa-Re-Ga-Ma-Pa singing reality show aired in Zee Kannada.

Family
Vani was born into a family of musicians. Her grandfather, G. K. Venkatesh, was a music composer of Kannada cinema. She is married to V. Harikrishna, a music director and has a son named Aditya.

Filmography

As a music director

As a singer
{|class="wikitable sortable"
! Year !! Film !! Song !! Music Director
|-
| 2008 || Inthi Ninna Preethiya || "Madhuvana Karedare" || Sadhu Kokila
|-
| 2008 || Meghave Meghave || "Hey Neeli Gagana" || V. Harikrishna
|-
| 2008 || Payana || "Jaare" || V. Harikrishna
|-
| 2009 || Maleyali Jotheyali || "Maleyali Jotheyali" || V. Harikrishna
|-
| 2009 || Cheluveye Ninne Nodalu || "Olave Ninne" || V. Harikrishna
|-
| 2011 || Paramathma || "Hesaru Poorthi" || V. Harikrishna
|-
| 2011 || Saarathi || "Haago Heego" || V. Harikrishna
|-
| 2011 || Police Story 3 || "Banna Banna" || Sagar S
|-
| 2011 || Dushta || Jhinke Oh Jhinke || S. Narayan
|-
| 2012 || Addhuri || "Mussanje Veleli" || V. Harikrishna
|-
| 2012 || Shikari || "Kannadiye" || V. Harikrishna
|-
| 2012 || Snehitaru || "Badukodu Hege" || V. Harikrishna
|-
| 2013 || Loosegalu || "Bele Haari" || Vani Harikrishna
|-
| 2013 || Kaddipudi || "Bere Yaro" || V. Harikrishna
|-
| 2014 || Ulidavaru Kandanthe || "Kanna Muchche" || Ajneesh Loknath
|-
| 2014 || Dove || "Heegu Irabahude" || Arjun Janya
|-
| 2014 || Bahaddur || "Neene Neene" || V. Harikrishna
|-
| 2017|| "Hombanna" || "Ambiganirade" || Vinu Manasu
|-
|}

Awards
 Won - Karnataka State Film Award for Best Female Playback Singer for the song Madhuvana Karedare from the film Inthi Ninna Preethiya written by Jayanth Kaikini and composed by Sadhu Kokila.
 Won - Suvarna Film Award for Best Female Playback Singer 2011 for the song Haago Heego from the film Saarathi written by Nagendra Prasad and composed by V. Harikrishna.
 Won - Suvarna Film Award for Best Female Playback Singer 2012 for the song Mussanje Veleli from the film Addhuri written by Arjun and composed by V. Harikrishna.
 Won - Mirchi Music Awards South for 'The Best Female Playback Singer 2012' for the song Mussanje Veleli from the film Addhuri written by Arjun and composed by V. Harikrishna.
 Won - South Indian International Movie Awards for Best Female Playback Singer for the song "Mussanje Veleli" from the film Addhuri written by Arjun and composed by V. Harikrishna.
 Nominated -Filmfare Award for Best Female Playback Singer – Kannada for the song Mussanje Veleli from the film Addhuri written by Arjun and composed by V. Harikrishna.
 Won - South Indian International Movie Awards for Best Female Playback Singer for the song "Bere Yaaro" from the film Kaddipudi''.

References

External links
Vani Harikrishna hits

Living people
Year of birth missing (living people)
Singers from Bangalore
Indian women playback singers
Indian women composers
21st-century Indian composers
Kannada playback singers
Kannada film score composers
21st-century Indian singers
Film musicians from Karnataka
Women musicians from Karnataka
21st-century Indian women singers
21st-century women composers